Syzran-Samara operation (September, 14 - October 9, 1918) was the Red Army's offensive against the People Army of Komuch during the Russian Civil War.

Background 
After losing Simbirsk Volga Army of Whites (commander - Stanislav Čeček) consisted of 2nd Division, Volga group and Khvalynsk group, and Volga Fleet (about 9800 men in common), 60% of them defended Syzran and Khvalynsk.

Red's Eastern Front (commander - Jukums Vācietis) ordered the 1st Army (commander - Mikhail Tukhachevsky) together with Volsk Division and Red Volga Fleet to attack and capture Syzran; 4th Army (commander - Tikhon Khvesin) was ordered to attack Samara. Red forces were about 15700 men in common.

The battle 
At first Red's advancing was slow. Volsk Division captured Khvalynsk in September, 16, but lost the town after the White's counterattack. Simbirsk Division had to defend Simbirsk against White's counterattack, therefore 1st Army could use two divisions only in its advance to Syzran.

At September, 21, the commander of Eastern Front ordered the 4th Army to assist the 1st Army in capturing Syzran, and then to attack Samara. The advance progressed, at September, 26, Volsk Division captured Khvalynsk again, Penza Division moved close to Syzran.

The next day, Simbirsk Division took part in advancing after the victory near Simbirsk, and 1st Army became to advance to Syzran by two groups - Northern and Southern. Samara Division of 4th Army advanced to Syzran, other troops of 4th Army advanced to Samara.

On October, 1, troops of Samara Division closed from the south to the Syzran-Samara railway and cut it. Simbirsk Division made a forced march and came close to Syzran. Ar October, 1, Syzran was captured by Reds, Whites retreated to Samara.

Volsk Division was removed to the 4th Army, and 4th Army began its advancing to Samara. On October, 7, 4th Army together with rebellion workers inside the city captured Samara.

Aftermath 
After capturing Syzran and Samara Soviet Republic became able to use the whole Volga River for transportation bread and oil from the southern regions. Army received good starting positions for the advancing to the Buguruslan and Uralsk.

Sources 
 Article about operation (in Russian)
 Map of the operation

Battles of the Russian Civil War
Czechoslovak Legion
Battles involving Bohemia
September 1918 events
October 1918 events
Russian Civil War
Battles involving Czechoslovakia
Samara, Russia